Bejoy Narayan Mahavidyalaya, also known as Itachuna College, is the only college in Itachuna, West Bengal, India. Established in 1950, it is located in the district of Hooghly in West Bengal. It was affiliated with Calcutta University from 1950 to 1957, but has been affiliated with the University of Burdwan since then. The college offers honours and graduate courses in arts and science and offers 13 awards each year.

Accreditation
Bejoy Narayan Mahavidyalaya has been awarded a B++ grade by the National Assessment and Accreditation Council (NAAC). The college is also recognized by the University Grants Commission (UGC).

See also

References

External links

 Bejoy Narayan Mahavidyalaya

Colleges affiliated to University of Burdwan
Educational institutions established in 1950
Universities and colleges in Hooghly district
1950 establishments in West Bengal